Marian Fell translated the first published English language version of Anton Chekhov's The Seagull in the United States. It was performed at the Bandbox Theatre on Broadway by the Washington Square Players in 1916. The text is part of Project Gutenberg here.

The Marian Fell Library is an historic library in Fellsmere, Florida. It is located 63 North Cypress Street. It was added to the National Register of Historic Places in 1996.

References

 Marian Fell Library Condition Assessment Report, prepared by Renker, Eich, Parks Architects for the City of Fellsmere, August 2, 2010.

External links
 Indian River County listings at National Register of Historic Places
 Florida's Office of Cultural and Historical Programs
 Indian River County listings
 Marion Fell Library

National Register of Historic Places in Indian River County, Florida
Libraries in Florida
Buildings and structures in Indian River County, Florida